Longriggend railway station was a railway station serving the village of Longriggend, North Lanarkshire, Scotland. The station was part of the Slamannan Railway which amalgamated with several other local railways to form the Monkland Railways.

History 
The station opened in 1840 when the Slamannan Railway opened and closed to passengers on 1 May 1930.

References

Notes

Sources 
 
 
 

Disused railway stations in North Lanarkshire
Railway stations in Great Britain opened in 1840
Railway stations in Great Britain closed in 1930
Former North British Railway stations